Obzova is a mountain located on the Croatian island of Krk and the highest point of the island.

It lies in the middle of a Karst plateau in the south-eastern part of the island and is marked by a stone-pile, with points of similar height Veli Vrh and Vrska Glava to east and west.

See also 
 List of mountains in Croatia

References

Dinaric Alps
Mountains of Croatia